Arthur Marriott (1821–31 March 1866) was an English-born Australian cricketer who played for Tasmania. He was born in England and died in Nice.

Marriott made a single first-class appearance for the side, during the 1851–52 season, against Victoria. From the upper-middle order, he scored 2 runs in the first innings in which he batted, and 7 runs in the second.

See also
 List of Tasmanian representative cricketers

External links

1821 births
1866 deaths
Australian cricketers
Tasmania cricketers
English emigrants to Australia